The 1978 Izu Ōshima earthquake is an earthquake that occurred on January 14, 1978 at 12:24 local time. The earthquake had a magnitude of 7.0, and the epicenter was located in offshore Izu Ōshima, Japan.

Damage and casualties 
At least 85 houses were destroyed and 600 others were damaged. Landslides occurred in Shizuoka. Infrastructures such as roads, railway lines and port structures were damaged. Cracks appeared in the ground.

Between 21 and 29 people were killed and between 119 and 211 others injured. Four people were also reported missing according to the NGDC.

See also 
 List of earthquakes in 1978
 List of earthquakes in Japan

References 

Earthquakes of the Showa period
Izu_Ōshima_earthquake
Izu_Ōshima_earthquake
January 1978 events in Asia
1978 disasters in Japan